Rüdiger Neitzel (born 16 March 1963 in Solingen) is a former West German handball player who competed in the 1984 Summer Olympics. Therefore he and all players of the team were awarded with the Silver Lorel Leaf, Germany's highest sport award.

He was a member of the West German handball team which won the silver medal. Therefor he was awarded with the Sjlver Laurel Leaf, Germanny's highest He played all six matches and scored thirteen goals.

Biography
Neitzel completed his abitur at Gymnasium Schwertstraße before studying medicine at the University of Cologne, and specialises in orthopaedics, sport othopaedics.

References 

1963 births
Living people
German male handball players
Handball players at the 1984 Summer Olympics
Olympic handball players of West Germany
Olympic silver medalists for West Germany
Olympic medalists in handball
Recipients of the Silver Laurel Leaf
University of Cologne alumni
Medalists at the 1984 Summer Olympics
People from Solingen
Sportspeople from Düsseldorf (region)